Kingston Center or Kingston Centre may refer to:

Kingston Center, Ohio, an unincorporated community
Kingston Center Historic District, in Massachusetts
Kingston Centre, a shopping mall in Canada